Vo Slavu Velikim! (Во славу Великим!) is the third full-length album by the Russian folk metal band Arkona. It was released on 24 September 2005 through Sound Age Production. It was re-released in 2008 by Vic Records.

Reception

A review of the 2008 re-release by German magazine Sonic Seducer was very favourable, calling the album a proof that Arkona were among "the very best and the most aesthetic" pagan folk metal bands world-wide. The reviewer praised singer Maria Arkhipova's voice as well as the dynamic and highly melodic compositions.

Track listing

Credits
 Masha "Scream" – vocals, choir, keyboards, acoustic guitar
 Sergei "Lazar" – guitars, vocals, choir
 Ruslan "Kniaz" – bass
 Vlad "Artist" – drums, percussion

Additional musicians
 Vladimir Cherepovsky – various folk instruments
 Ilya "Wolfenhirt" – vocals, choir
 Igor "Hurry" – accordion
 Andrey Karasev – violin

References

2005 albums
Arkona (band) albums